SkyLink Express is a cargo airline headquartered in Mississauga, Ontario, Canada. It operates dedicated air cargo / courier feeder flights throughout Canada and the United States and provides on demand air cargo charters from its bases in Vancouver, Calgary, Winnipeg, Hamilton and Montréal-Mirabel.

History 
The airline was established in February 1994 as QuikAire Cargo Inc. by Dan Rocheleau, founder and president of the airline, started the airline using the Cessna 208 Caravan to meet a specialized demand in the Canadian short-haul air cargo market and several 208B Grand Caravans  are in use by the airline today.

In April 1996, QuikAire Cargo Inc. formed a partnership with SkyLink Group of Companies and rebranded itself as SkyLink Express Inc. The new relationship fostered the next stage of growth for the airline as it acquired courier feeder contracts across Canada. In 1996, SkyLink Express also became the first carrier in Canada to operate Raytheon factory-converted, all-cargo, Beechcraft 1900 aircraft. Today, the airline operates the largest Beechcraft 1900C fleet in Canada and second largest in North America.

In July 2009, SkyLink Express entered into a partnership with Cargojet to combine SkyLink Express operational assets and routes with a Cargojet subsidiary, Prince Edward Air, to consolidate regional air cargo operations into Cargojet Regional Partnership.

In July 2010, SkyLink Express purchased 100% of Cargojet Regional Partnership from Cargojet.

In 2013, SkyLink Express expanded into Western Canada as new flight crew / maintenance bases were launched in Vancouver (August 2013)  and Winnipeg (September 2013).

Past and present courier/cargo feeder operations include United Parcel Service (UPS), FedEx, DHL Express, Altimax, Canada Post, Cargojet, Dynamex, Midland Courier, Purolator Inc. and Sameday Worldwide.

Facilities 
SkyLink Express maintains facilities in the following Canadian cities (as of November 2022):
Vancouver
Calgary
Winnipeg
Hamilton
Mississauga
Quebec City / Montreal

Fleet 
The SkyLink Express fleet consists of the following aircraft (as of November 2022):

References

External links 
SkyLink Express

Regional airlines of Ontario
Cargo airlines
Cargo airlines of Canada
Charter airlines of Canada